Tom Smith (24 May 1873 – 25 October 1928) was an Australian rules footballer who played with South Melbourne in the Victorian Football League (VFL).

Notes

External links 

1873 births
1928 deaths
Australian rules footballers from Victoria (Australia)
Sydney Swans players